Indira Gandhi Government College, Tezu, established in 1986, is a general degree college in Tezu, Arunachal Pradesh. It offers undergraduate courses in science, arts and commerce. It is affiliated to  Rajiv Gandhi University.

Departments

Science
Chemistry
Physics
Mathematics
Botany
Zoology

Arts and Commerce
Hindi
English
History
Political Science
Philosophy
Education
Geography
Economics
Commerce

Accreditation
The college is recognized by the University Grants Commission (UGC).

References

External links
http://www.iggc.org.in/

Colleges affiliated to Rajiv Gandhi University
Educational institutions established in 1986
Universities and colleges in Arunachal Pradesh
1986 establishments in Arunachal Pradesh